Largan or Laregan may refer to:
 Largan, Isfahan (لارگان - Lārgān)
 Largan, Chalus (لرگان - Largān), Mazandaran Province
 Largan, Nowshahr (لرگان - Largān), Mazandaran Province